"Sussudio" is a song by English singer-songwriter Phil Collins, released as a single in January 1985. The song is the first track on Collins' third solo studio album, No Jacket Required, released in February of the same year. The song entered frequent rotation on MTV in May; by 6 July both single and album reached No. 1 on their respective US Billboard charts. The song peaked at No. 12 in the UK Singles Chart.

Production and recording
Collins has said that he "improvised" the lyric. Collins was just playing around with a drum machine, and the lyric "su-sussudio" was what came out of his mouth. "So I kinda knew I had to find something else for that word, then I went back and tried to find another word that scanned as well as 'sussudio,' and I couldn't find one, so I went back to 'sussudio'", Collins said. According to Collins, the lyrics are about a schoolboy crush on a girl at school.

The synthesizer, rhythm and synth bass arrangement, sound design, and programming was done by David Frank of The System, and the horn arrangements were done later based on the motif from the bassline.

Music video
The music video for the song was filmed at a pub owned at the time by Richard Branson (The Princess Victoria in Shepherd's Bush) in London. The accompanying music video features Collins, as well as long-time collaborators Daryl Stuermer and Chester Thompson. The video begins with a man telling his family he is taking his dog for a walk, with them ignoring him while watching TV (which happens to be playing the music video for Phil Collins' debut solo single "In the Air Tonight"). He passes outside a pub, with live music being played. It then cuts to Collins and his band inside playing for an uninterested crowd. The crowd slowly migrates toward the band as the song progresses, leaving them cheering at the end. Bass player Lee Sklar also appears in the video; however, neither Sklar nor Thompson played on the studio recording.

Critical reception
Some music critics have suggested that the song sounds very similar to "1999" by Prince. Collins does not deny the similarity between the two songs; he stated that he is a fan of Prince's work and remembers listening to "1999" frequently while he was on tour with Genesis. Tom Breihan of Stereogum commented in 2020 that "in making funky dance-pop, Collins committed the same sin as almost everyone else who made funky dance-pop in the mid-'80s: he bit Prince." According to Breihan, "if something like that happened today, Collins would've at least had to give Prince a songwriting credit." However, he acknowledged that "even if one groove is a distinct copy of another, everything else is different."

Keegan Hamilton of The Riverfront Times said that the song was the best track on the album, saying that it's "catchy gibberish." "Even though this song isn't on the Flashdance soundtrack, it makes me want to put on some goofy legwarmers and kick out an aerobics routine. Where the vast majority of artists from this era try out the synthesizer/keyboard/horn section soup and fail miserably, Collins seems to have the recipe down to a science," Hamilton adds. Robert Hilburn of The Los Angeles Times thought the song had a "friskier R&B style" as compared to Collins' other songs, and agreed that it sounded very much like the Prince song. Michael R. Smith of The Daily Vault believed that "Sussudio" was the best track on the album, calling it a "monster track"; he also added that:

Other reviewers have criticised the song. David Fricke of Rolling Stone said that songs like "Sussudio", with the heavy use of a horn section, were "beginning to wear thin." In 2001, the chief rock and pop critic of The Guardian, Alexis Petridis, called the song a "vapid funk workout". In 2013, Tom Service, also of The Guardian, wrote: "Sussudio brings me out in a cold sweat; the production, the drum machine, the inane sincerity of the lyrics; there's no colder or more superficial sound in popular music, precisely because it takes itself so seriously."

"Sussudio" was the first track released as a single in the UK and the second to be released in the US. In the UK, the song reached number 12. In the US, the song entered frequent rotation on MTV in May and, by 6 July, both the single and the album had reached No. 1 on their respective US Billboard charts. A remix of the song appeared on Collins' 12"ers album.

Track listings
7-inch: Virgin / VS736 (UK)
 "Sussudio"
 "The Man with the Horn"

7-inch: Atlantic / 7-89560 (US)
 "Sussudio"
 "I Like the Way"

12-inch: Virgin / VS736-12 (UK)
 "Sussudio" (extended remix)
 "Sussudio"
 "The Man with the Horn"

CD: WEA International / WPCR 2065 (Japan)
 "Sussudio"
 "Sussudio" (extended mix)

Personnel
 Phil Collins – vocals, Roland TR-909 drum machine
 David Frank – Oberheim OB-8 synthesizers, Minimoog bass, Oberheim DMX
 Daryl Stuermer – guitars
 The Phenix Horns
 Don Myrick – saxophone
 Louis Satterfield – trombone
 Michael Harris – trumpet
 Rahmlee Michael Davis – trumpet
Arranged by Tom Tom 84

Charts

Weekly charts

Year-end charts

Certifications

Release history

References

External links
 Sussudio video

1985 singles
1985 songs
Atlantic Records singles
Billboard Hot 100 number-one singles
Cashbox number-one singles
Funk songs
Phil Collins songs
Song recordings produced by Hugh Padgham
Song recordings produced by Phil Collins
Songs written by Phil Collins
Torch songs
Virgin Records singles